Alexander Russell "Sanny" Dick (1894 – 1958) was a Scottish footballer who played as a right back for Airdrieonians.

Installed as a first team regular in defence in his second season (he initially played as a forward after joining from Armadale, and featured less frequently), he missed only eight league matches across the four consecutive seasons where the Diamonds finished as runners-up in the Scottish Football League, and also played in the 1924 Scottish Cup Final in which Airdrie defeated Hibernian to claim their only major trophy. In 1927 he was advised to stop playing football for health reasons, and Jimmy Crapnell was brought in as a replacement; Dick had a brief spell with Dykehead in his home district after leaving Broomfield Park.

References

1894 births
1958 deaths
Scottish footballers
Footballers from North Lanarkshire
Armadale F.C. players
Airdrieonians F.C. (1878) players
Dykehead F.C. players
Scottish Football League players
Association football defenders